Seán Joseph Drea (born 3 March 1947) is a former Olympic rower from Ireland, specialising in the single scull. He won the Henley Royal Regatta's Diamond Sculls three years in a row, and was the first Irish rower to win a World Championship medal securing silver in the 1975 World Championships.

Drea lives in Greystones, and is originally from Muine Bheag, County Carlow. He tried many sports before joining Neptune Rowing Club after moving to Dublin to work in advertising. He later went to Philadelphia, where he attended St. Joseph's University on a scholarship and also rowed for Vesper Boat Club. He lost to Aleksandr Timoshinin in the final of the 1972 Diamond Sculls when the steering fin broke off his boat. At the 1972 Olympics, he came seventh. In 1974, he won the U.S. national championships, and was the favorite for the World Championships in Rotsee; however he withdrew for an emergency kidney stone removal. At the 1975 World Championships, he finished second to Peter-Michael Kolbe. At the 1976 Olympics, he broke the 2000 m world record in the semi-final with a time of 6:52.46.  However, he finished fourth in the final after a poor third quarter.

Drea spent years in Philadelphia as a coach for Fairmount Rowing Association, La Salle University and the US national team, and rowed in the Head of the River Race in 1997 with a veteran Schuylkill Navy crew. Today, Drea lives in Greystones, Co. Wicklow, Ireland and runs an organic farming business.

Sean's son Jack Drea rowed for Oxford Brookes University and won the Temple Challenge Cup at Henley Royal Regatta in 2006 and competed in the Ladies Challenge Plate in a Oxford Brookes & Oxford University composite in 2007.

Record

References

1947 births
Living people
Irish male rowers
Olympic rowers of Ireland
Organic farmers
Rowers at the 1972 Summer Olympics
Rowers at the 1976 Summer Olympics
Saint Joseph's University alumni
Sportspeople from County Carlow
World Rowing Championships medalists for Ireland